Baron  was a Japanese mathematician, educator, and education administrator during the Meiji era.

Biography

Early life and family 
Kikuchi was born in Edo (present-day Tokyo), as the second son of Mitsukuri Shūhei, a professor at Bansho Shirabesho, himself the adopted son of Mitsukuri Gempo, a Shogunate professor. The Mitsukuri family had distinguished themselves as scholars, and were at the centre of Japan's educational system in the Meiji era. His grandfather had been a student of Dutch studies ("rangaku").

Kikuchi Dairoku changed his surname from Mitsukuri to Kikuchi upon succeeding as the heir to his father's original family; the requisite legal procedures were completed in 1877.

Education 
After attending the Bansho Shirabesho, the Shogunal institute for western studies, he was sent to Great Britain, in 1866, at age 11, the youngest of a group of Japanese sent by the Tokugawa shogunate to the University College School, on the advice of the then British foreign minister Edward Stanley, 15th Earl of Derby.

Kikuchi returned to England in 1870 and was the first Japanese student to graduate from the University of Cambridge (St. John's College) and the only one to graduate from the University of London in the 19th century. His specialisation was in physics and mathematics. In 1884 he attended the International Meridian Conference in Washington, D.C. and the master class of Kelvin in Baltimore.

Career 
After returning to Japan, Kikuchi later became president of Tokyo Imperial University, Minister of Education (1901–1903,) and president of Kyoto Imperial University. In 1909 he lectured in London on Japanese Education and 1910 at New York on New Japan: Its Intellectual and Moral Development.

His textbook on elementary geometry was the most widely used geometry textbook in Japan until the end of World War II.

Kikuchi was made a baron under the kazoku peerage system in 1902 and was the eighth president of the Gakushūin Peers' School. In 1917 he became the first president of RIKEN, but died that same year.

Family and issue
Kikuchi's children became well-known scientists, and his grandson Minobe Ryōkichi became governor of Tokyo.

See also

General
Japanese students in Britain
Tokyo Imperial University
University of Cambridge
Anglo-Japanese relations
Hayashi Tadasu — another member of the group sent to Britain in 1866, by the Bakufu
Imperial Rescript on Education

Japanese at Cambridge
Other Japanese who studied at the University of Cambridge after Kikuchi:

Inagaki Manjirō
Ōkura Kishichirō
Suematsu Kenchō
Tanaka Ginnosuke

British contemporaries at Cambridge
British contemporaries of Kikuchi at the University of Cambridge:

Donald MacAlister
Karl Pearson — a close friend and contemporary of Kikuchi at University College School and the University of Cambridge
Charles Algernon Parsons

References and further reading

Cobbing, Andrew. The Japanese Discovery of Victorian Britain. RoutledgeCurzon, London, 1998. 
Keane, Donald. Emperor Of Japan: Meiji And His World, 1852–1912. Columbia University Press (2005). 
'Kikuchi Dairoku, 1855–1917: Educational Administrator and Pioneer of Modern Mathematical Education in Japan,' by Noboru Koyama, Chapter 7, Britain & Japan: Biographical Portraits Volume 5, Global Oriental 2005,

External links

Japanese Students at Cambridge University in the Meiji Era, 1868–1912: Pioneers for the Modernization of Japan, by Noboru Koyama, translated by Ian Ruxton , (Lulu Press, September 2004). Kikuchi is the central figure in this book.
Portrait of Kikuchi Dairoku on the National Diet Library database, Tokyo
RIKEN — The Science Research Institute of Japan
 
 

1855 births
1917 deaths
19th-century Japanese mathematicians
20th-century Japanese mathematicians
Alumni of St John's College, Cambridge
Alumni of the University of London
Education ministers of Japan
Japanese expatriates in the United Kingdom
Kazoku
Academic staff of Kyoto University
Mitsukuri family
People educated at University College School
People from Tokyo
People of Meiji-period Japan
Presidents of the University of Tokyo
Presidents of Kyoto University
Riken personnel
Academic staff of the University of Tokyo
Textbook writers